Schoonoord can refer to:
Schoonoord, South Africa
Schoonoord, Coevorden
Schoonoord (North Holland)
Schoonoord (Rotterdam)
Schoonoord (windmill)